Sky Atlantic is a British pay television channel owned by Sky Group Limited broadcast in the United Kingdom and Ireland. The channel is primarily dedicated to imported programmes from the United States, and holds the domestic rights to HBO programming until 2025 (this does not cover HBO Max Original programming). It also broadcasts many original British produced Sky dramas. It is exclusively available on the Sky satellite TV platform (including Sky Go) and Sky's Now TV platform. Unlike the other channels from Sky Group, Sky Atlantic is not on Virgin Media.

Sky Deutschland broadcasts a German-language version of the channel in Germany and Austria, while Sky Italia broadcasts an Italian-language version of the channel in Italy. Their programming is also dominated by HBO and Showtime series, usually dubbed in the domestic language. The Italian channel also premieres Sky Originals produced in the country, like The Young Pope and Gomorrah.

Background
Sky Atlantic launched on 1 February 2011 on Sky in the United Kingdom and Ireland. Separated channels with the same name operate in Germany, Austria and Italy.

Sky Atlantic is available in both standard definition and high definition, the latter on Sky Atlantic HD. Stuart Murphy extended his responsibilities to become director of programmes for Sky One, Sky Two, Pick and Sky Atlantic. On 5 May 2011, Elaine Pyke, the head of drama at Sky, was promoted to director of Sky Atlantic, reporting to Murphy.

Programmes on the channel are also offered to Sky customers via on-demand channels including the On Demand and Sky Go services and Now TV. Both BT TV and Virgin Media had held talks with Sky over the new channel but have been unable to agree a carriage deal, in Virgin's case due to pricing.

It was announced on 25 October 2010 that Sky Atlantic would launch on Sky channel 108, which was previously occupied by Sky 3. Sky Atlantic also utilises the HD swap bouquet system developed by Sky, which switches SD channels with HD channels for HD Pack subscribers, meaning Sky Atlantic HD is on channel 108 and the standard definition version appears on channel 808.

Sky Atlantic +1
A one-hour timeshift of Sky Atlantic started broadcasting on 20 September 2012 on channel 173. It moved to channel 170 on 9 June 2015 as part of a reshuffle which also included the closure of Sky 3D, Sky Livingit becoming Real Lives and Sky Arts 1 and Sky Arts 2 merging to become simply Sky Arts. It moved to channel 217 on 18 July 2017 as part of the Sky Sports reshuffle which included Sky Sports Mix moving to entertainment, and again to 208 on 1 May 2018 as part of Sky's major EPG reshuffle due to Sky Atlantic being channel 108.

Sky Atlantic VIP
Sky Atlantic VIP was a rewards channel for subscribers of Sky TV who had been with Sky for 2 or more years and for subscribers who had the Sky Original Bundle (later Sky Entertainment pack, then Sky Signature pack). The HD version also required the HD pack in the UK and the Sky Box Sets pack in Ireland.

The channel only broadcast brand new episodes of a popular show a week or so before being shown on the main Sky Atlantic channel. An example of this is when episodes of Riviera were shown first on Sky Atlantic VIP, then a week or so later on Sky Atlantic. Sky Atlantic VIP was under Sky VIP's "See-It-First" offer. Sky VIP is a rewards programme for long-term Sky subscribers.

When the channel was not broadcasting a brand new episode of a programme, the channel was off-air resulting in the channel being on-air only for a few hours per week. The channel only broadcast adverts for programmes on Sky channels. The SD version was on Sky channel 994 with the HD version on channel 995. The channel closed on 12 June 2019.

Current programming

Drama

Comedy

Upcoming programming

Drama

Comedy

Co-productions

Former programming

Drama

Comedy

Unscripted

Co-productions

Acquired programming
Sky Atlantic relies heavily on screenings of US television programmes, with more than 50% of all programming coming from HBO. Although the channel mainly screens dramas, blocks in the channel's schedule are dedicated to comedies and movies. The launch of Sky Atlantic in 2011 followed the broadcaster's £150m, five-year deal to buy exclusive UK and Irish TV rights to HBO's entire archive, new HBO programming and a first-look deal on all co-productions.Although it has been renewed since, the exclusivity deal with HBO is currently set to expire by the end of 2025, allowing for the launch of HBO Max in the UK, Ireland, Germany, Austria and Italy.

In January 2016, Sky expanded the acquired programming on Atlantic after purchasing the exclusive rights to Showtime programming; however, Sky Atlantic does not broadcast all Showtime programmes, as some series would later air on Channel 4.The exclusivity deal with Showtime expired in December 2021, with future series becoming exclusive to Paramount+.

Starting in 2020, select HBO Max programming would also be acquired.

HBO programming

Ballers
Barry (seasons 1–2)
Big Little Lies
Big Love (season 5)
Boardwalk Empire
Bored to Death
The Brink
Camping
The Comeback (season 2)
Curb Your Enthusiasm (season 9)
Crashing
The Deuce
Divorce
Enlightened
Encourage (seasons 7–8)
Euphoria
Funny or Die Presents
Game of Thrones
The Gilded Age
Girls
Hello Ladies
Here and Now
High Maintenance
House of the Dragon
How to Make It in America
I Know This Much Is True
Insecure (seasons 1–3)
In Treatment (season 4)
Irma Vep
The Last of Us
Last Week Tonight with John Oliver (seasons 3–6)
The Leftovers
Looking
Lovecraft Country
Luck
Mare of Easttown
Mildred Pierce
Mosaic
The Nevers
The Newsroom
The Night Of
Olive Kitteridge
The Outsider
Perry Mason
The Plot Against America
Real Time with Bill Maher (seasons 14–17)
The Rehearsal
Room 104
Scenes from a Marriage
Sharp Objects
Show Me a Hero
Silicon Valley
Succession
The Time Traveler's Wife
Togetherness
Treme
True Detective
The Undoing
Vinyl
We Own This City
Westworld
Watchmen
Winning Time: The Rise of the Lakers Dynasty
The White Lotus
Veep
Vice Principals

HBO Max programming
Julia
Raised By Wolves
The Staircase

Showtime programming

The Affair
American Rust (season 1)
Billions
Black Monday (season 1)
City on a Hill (seasons 1–2)
The Comey Rule
Dexter: New Blood
Dice
Escape at Dannemora
The Good Lord Bird
Happyish
House of Lies
I'm Dying Up Here
Kidding
The Loudest Voice
The L Word: Generation Q (seasons 1–2)
Nurse Jackie (seasons 3–7)
Penny Dreadful: City of Angels
Ray Donovan
SMILF
Twin Peaks: The Return
White Famous
Yellowjackets
Your Honor (season 1)

Most watched programmes
The following is a list of the ten most watched programmes on Sky Atlantic (all of them being episodes of Game of Thrones), based on Live +7 data supplied by BARB up to 20 May 2019. The number of viewers does not include repeats or Irish ratings. Additionally, all of these episodes were the most viewed programme of the week on non-terrestrial television in the UK. Game of Thrones is Sky's most popular show.

Notes

References

External links
 

Sky television channels
Television channels and stations established in 2011
2011 establishments in the United Kingdom
English-language television stations in the United Kingdom
Television channels in the United Kingdom